Atemlos (German for "Breathless") is the sixth studio album of German electronica and global pop artist Christopher von Deylen under his principal project, the band "Schiller". The album was released on March 12, 2010.  The album contains 30 new compositions from Schiller, including two electronic symphonies in 5.1 surround sound. It was internationally marketed as Breathless.

Like Deylen's earlier albums, Atemlos features collaborations with other international artists. Anna Maria Mühe, Jaki Liebezeit, Odette Di Maio, Midge Ure, Kate Havnevik, Anggun, Lenka, Mia Bergström, Kim Sanders and Henree contribute vocals to the album. The first single, "Try", featuring Nadia Ali, was released three weeks before the official album launch date.

The album is inspired by Deylen's month-long voyage with the scientific research vessel Polarstern. To support the album, a tour of the same name was made between 14 and 30 May 2010.

The album achieved platinum status in Germany in 2016.

Limited Super Deluxe Edition
A super deluxe edition box set of the album contained three discs (2 CD + 1 DVD).

Track listing

Super Deluxe Edition
CD 01:

CD 02:

Disc 3 (DVD):
Elektronik-Symphonie
Luft
Wasser

Atemlos 5.1 (Audio Only)
Willkommen
Tiefblau
Playing With Madness with Mia Bergström
Polarstern
Himmelblau
Leidenschaft with Jaki Liebezeit
Soho
Hochland
Always You feat. Anggun
Reprise

Studiosession with Jaki Liebezeit

Expedition into the Arctic Sea

Photo-Gallery
Schiller
Polarstern

Charts

Year-end charts

References 

2010 compilation albums
Compilation albums by German artists
Schiller (band) albums